Ahmad Hilmi of Filibe (or Ahmet Hilmi) (1865–1914) was a Sufi Turkish language writer and thinker. In Turkish he is usually called Şehbenderzâde Filibeli Ahmed Hilmi ("Ahmad Hilmi of Plovdiv Son of A Consul"). Being a Sufi, his thoughts were influenced by the Sufi thought, more specifically the wahdat al-wujud, greatly. He also supported the anti-materialistic way of thinking and was a great rival to his materialist contemporary writer and thinkers.

Biography 
He was born in Plovdiv (Filibe), where his father, Süleyman Bey, was a consul. This is where his title Şehbenderzâde, meaning "son of a consul", comes from. He has taken his first education from the religious official (müftü) of Plovdiv, until he moved to İzmir with his family. Later he entered Galatasaray Lycee. Upon the end of his education, he started to work as a government official in Beirut. Due to a political problem he ran away to Egypt from Beirut. In 1901 he returned to İstanbul, but later he was arrested and exiled to Fizan. Here his interest in Sufism grew and he started to believe in the Sufi thought of wahdat al-wujud (وحدة الوجود, "unity of being"). His entry into Sufism changed his views greatly and the influence of Sufism on his works are very clear.

In 1908, following the declaration of the Constitutional government (Meşrutiyet) he returned to İstanbul. Here, he started to publish a weekly newspaper named İttihat-ı İslam ("Islamic Union"). However the newspaper could not continue for a long time and he started to write in some other papers. In 1910, he started to publish another weekly newspaper named Hikmet ("Wisdom"). The same year, he established a publishing house named Hikmet Matbaa-yi İslâmiyesi ("Wisdom Islamic Publishing"), which published mostly works on Islamic thought.

With his own unique thought he started to criticise İttihat ve Terakki Cemiyeti ("Committee of Union and Progress"), mostly in his newspaper Hikmet, which was turned into a daily paper from weekly by the year of 1911.

Due to his thoughts and his great efforts to publish them, his paper Hikmet was banned, along with his publishing company, and he was exiled to Bursa. However, following the end of his exile, he started to publish Hikmet again. As a result of his ideas, which were not close to any major political group of the time, his paper could not continue to publish for very long. His masterpiece is the famous "A'mâk-ı Hayâl", ("The Depths of Imagination") which is about the wahdat al-wujud.

Writing many pieces, most of which are Islamic and anti-materialistic, he also published a humor magazine named Coşkun Kalender. Apart from his writer identity, he also worked as a philosophy teacher in Dârü'l-Fünûn (Istanbul University).

He died in October 1914 due to poisoning. It is not very clear if it was a murder or not, however there is a well-circulated conspiracy theory that he was poisoned by Freemasons, who were his well-known rivals. This conspiracy theory has no evidence.

References

External links 
"Şehbenderzâde Filibeli Ahmed Hilmi" from the Republic of Turkey, Ministry of Culture and Tourism Website
"Aşk Defterleri" Beyaz Arif Akbaş,Yalnızgöz Yayınları;2010

1865 births
1914 deaths
19th-century writers from the Ottoman Empire
Ottoman Sufis
Turkish-language writers